The Unknown Dancer (French: Le danseur inconnu) is a 1929 French silent film directed by René Barberis and starring Véra Flory, André Nicolle and André Roanne.

Cast
 Véra Flory as Louise  
 André Nicolle as Balthazar  
 André Roanne as Henri Calvel  
 Janet Young as Bertha  
 Maryanne as Mme. Edmond  
 Paul Ollivier as Gonthier  
 Georges Herric as Herbert 
 Labusquière as Gonzales  
 Jean Godard as Thiraudel  
 Charles Frank as Berthier  
 Albert Broquin as Remy  
 Major Heitner as Vieux Monsieur

References

Bibliography 
 Philippe Rège. Encyclopedia of French Film Directors, Volume 1. Scarecrow Press, 2009.

External links 
 

1929 films
French silent feature films
1920s French-language films
Films directed by René Barberis
French black-and-white films
1920s French films